Anne Elizabeth Applebaum (born July 25, 1964) is a Polish-American journalist and historian. She has written extensively about the history of Communism and the development of civil society in Central and Eastern Europe.

She has worked at The Economist and The Spectator, and was a member of the editorial board of The Washington Post (2002–2006). Applebaum won the Pulitzer Prize in 2004 for Gulag: A History published the previous year. She is a staff writer for The Atlantic and a senior fellow at The Agora Institute at Johns Hopkins University School of Advanced International Studies.

Early life and education
Applebaum was born in Washington, D.C. Applebaum has stated that she was brought up in a "very reformed" Jewish family. Her ancestors came to America from what is now Belarus. She graduated from the Sidwell Friends School (1982). Applebaum earned a Bachelor of Arts, summa cum laude, in history and literature from Yale University, where she attended the Soviet history course taught by Wolfgang Leonhard in fall 1982. 

As a student, Applebaum spent the summer of 1985 in Leningrad, Soviet Union (now Saint Petersburg, Russia), which, she has written, helped to shape her opinions. She was also elected to Phi Beta Kappa. As a Marshall Scholar at the London School of Economics, she earned a master's degree in international relations (1987). She studied at St Antony's College, Oxford, before becoming a correspondent for The Economist and moving to Warsaw, Poland, in 1988.

In November 1989, Applebaum drove from Warsaw to Berlin to report on the collapse of the Berlin Wall.

Career 
As foreign correspondent for The Economist and The Independent, she covered the fall of the Berlin Wall and the fall of communism. In 1991 she moved back to England to work for The Economist, and was later hired as the Foreign and later Deputy Editor of The Spectator, and later the Political Editor of the Evening Standard. 

In 1994, she published her first book Between East and West: Across the Borderlands of Europe, a travelogue that described the rise of nationalism across the new states of the former Soviet Union. In 2001, she did a major interview with prime minister Tony Blair. She also undertook historical research for her book Gulag: A History (2003) on the Soviet prison camp system, which won the 2004 Pulitzer Prize for General Non-Fiction. It was also nominated for a National Book Award, for the Los Angeles Times book award and for the National Book Critics Circle Award.

From 2001 to 2005, Applebaum lived in Washington and was a member of The Washington Post editorial board. She wrote about a wide range of United States policy issues, including healthcare, social security and education. She also wrote a column for The Washington Post which continued for seventeen years. Applebaum was briefly an adjunct fellow at the American Enterprise Institute, a conservative think tank. Returning to Europe in 2005, Applebaum was a George Herbert Walker Bush/Axel Springer Fellow at the American Academy in Berlin, Germany, in 2006.

Her second history book, Iron Curtain: The Crushing of Eastern Europe 1944–56, was published in 2012 by Doubleday in the US and Allen Lane in the UK; it was nominated for a National Book Award, shortlisted for the 2013 PEN/John Kenneth Galbraith Award.

From 2011 to 2016, she created and ran the Transitions Forum at the Legatum Institute, an international think tank and educational charity based in London. Among other projects, she ran a two-year program examining the relationship between democracy and growth in Brazil, India and South Africa, created the Future of Syria and Future of Iran projects on future institutional change in those two countries, and commissioned a series of papers on corruption in Georgia, Moldova and Ukraine. 

Together with Foreign Policy magazine she created Democracy Lab, a website focusing on countries in transition to, or away from, democracy and which has since become Democracy Post at The Washington Post. She also ran Beyond Propaganda, a program examining 21st century propaganda and disinformation. Started in 2014, the program anticipated later debates about "fake news". In 2016, she left Legatum because of its stance on Brexit following the appointment of Euroskeptic Philippa Stroud as CEO and joined the London School of Economics as a Professor of Practice at the Institute for Global Affairs. At the LSE, she ran Arena, a program on disinformation and 21st century propaganda. In the autumn of 2019 she moved the project to the Agora Institute at Johns Hopkins University.

In October 2017, she published her third history book, Red Famine: Stalin's War on Ukraine, a history of the Holodomor. The book won the Lionel Gelber Prize and the Duff Cooper Prize for the second time, making her the only author to ever win the award twice.

In November 2019, The Atlantic announced that Applebaum was joining the publication as a staff writer starting in January 2020. She was included in the 2020 Prospect list of the top-50 thinkers for the COVID-19 era.

In July 2020, Twilight of Democracy: The Seductive Lure of Authoritarianism was published. Partly a memoir and partly political analysis, it was a Der Spiegel and New York Times bestseller.

Also in July 2020, Applebaum was one of the 153 signers of the "Harper's Letter" (also known as "A Letter on Justice and Open Debate") that expressed concern that "the free exchange of information and ideas, the lifeblood of a liberal society, is daily becoming more constricted."

In November 2022, Applebaum was one of 200 US citizens sanctioned by Russia for "promotion of the Russophobic campaign and support for the regime in Kyiv."

Positions

Russia 
Applebaum has been writing about Russia since the early 1990s. In 2000, she described the links between the then-new president of Russia, Vladimir Putin, with the former Soviet leader Yuri Andropov and the former KGB. In 2008, she began speaking about "Putinism" as an anti-democratic ideology, though most at the time still considered the Russian president to be a pro-Western pragmatist.

Applebaum has been a vocal critic of Western conduct regarding the Russian military intervention in Ukraine. In an article in The Washington Post on March 5, 2014, she maintained that the US and its allies should not continue to enable "the existence of a corrupt Russian regime that is destabilizing Europe", noting that the actions of President Vladimir Putin had violated "a series of international treaties". On March 7, in another article on The Daily Telegraph, discussing an information war, Applebaum argued that "a robust campaign to tell the truth about Crimea is needed to counter Moscow's lies". At the end of August, she asked whether Ukraine should prepare for "total war" with Russia and whether central Europeans should join them.

In 2014, writing in The New York Review of Books she asked (in a review of Karen Dawisha's Putin's Kleptocracy) whether "the most important story of the past twenty years might not, in fact, have been the failure of democracy, but the rise of a new form of Russian authoritarianism". She has described the "myth of Russian humiliation" and argued that NATO and EU expansion have been a "phenomenal success". In July 2016, before the US election, she wrote about connections between Donald Trump and Russia and wrote that Russian support for Trump was part of a wider Russian political campaign designed to destabilize the West. In December 2019, she wrote in The Atlantic that  "in the 21st century, we must also contend with a new phenomenon: right-wing intellectuals, now deeply critical of their own societies, who have begun paying court to right-wing dictators who dislike America."

Central Europe 
Applebaum has written about the history of central and eastern Europe, Poland in particular. In the conclusion to her book Iron Curtain, Applebaum argued that the reconstruction of civil society was the most important and most difficult challenge for the post-communist states of central Europe; in another essay, she argued that the modern authoritarian obsession with civil society repression dates back to Vladimir Lenin. She has written essays on the Polish film-maker Andrzej Wajda, on the dual Nazi–Soviet occupation of central Europe, and on why it is inaccurate to define "Eastern Europe" as a single entity.

Applebaum has described Poland's governing party, Law and Justice (PiS), as xenophobic and nationalist.

Middle East 
On October 1, 2002, Applebaum wrote an article for Slate entitled, "You Can't Assume a Nut Will Act Rationally," in which she argued that Saddam Hussein is not a rational agent in a manner comparable to Adolf Hitler and claimed Saddam had weapons of mass destruction (WMDs).

During the Second Intifada, a Palestinian rebellion against Israel, Applebaum defended the Israeli bombing of Palestinian radio and TV studios.

Disinformation, propaganda and fake news 
In 2014, Applebaum and Peter Pomerantsev launched Beyond Propaganda, a program examining disinformation and propaganda, at the Legatum Institute. Applebaum wrote that a 2014 Russian smear campaign aimed at her when she was writing heavily about the Russian annexation of Crimea. She stated that dubious material posted on the web was eventually recycled by semi-respectable American pro-Russian websites. Applebaum argued in 2015 that Facebook should take responsibility for spreading false stories and help "undo the terrible damage done by Facebook and other forms of social media to democratic debate and civilized discussion all over the world".

Nationalism 
In March 2016, eight months before the election of President Donald Trump, Applebaum wrote a Washington Post column asking, "Is this the end of the West as we know it?", which argued that "we are two or three bad elections away from the end of NATO, the end of the European Union and maybe the end of the liberal world order". Applebaum endorsed Hillary Clinton's campaign for president in July 2016 on the grounds that Trump is "a man who appears bent on destroying the alliances that preserve international peace and American power".

Applebaum's March 2016 Washington Post column prompted the Swiss newspaper Tages-Anzeiger and the German magazine Der Spiegel to interview her. The articles appeared in December 2016 and January 2017. She argued very early on that the movement had an international dimension, that populist groups in Europe share "ideas and ideology, friends and founders", and that, unlike Burkean conservatives, they seek to "overthrow the institutions of the present to bring back things that existed in the past—or that they believe existed in the past—by force." Applebaum has underlined the danger of a new "Nationalist International", a union of xenophobic, nationalist parties such as Law and Justice in Poland, the Northern League in Italy, and the Freedom Party in Austria.

In January 2022, Applebaum was invited to testify before the US House of Representatives Foreign Affairs Committee hearing entitled "Bolstering Democracy in the Age of Rising Authoritarianism".

Affiliations
Applebaum is a member of the Council on Foreign Relations. She is on the board of the National Endowment for Democracy and Renew Democracy Initiative. She was a member of the Institute for War and Peace Reporting's international board of directors. She was a Senior Adjunct Fellow at the Center for European Policy Analysis (CEPA) where she co-led a major initiative aimed at countering Russian disinformation in Central and Eastern Europe (CEE). She was on the editorial board for The American Interest and the Journal of Democracy.

Personal life
In 1992, Applebaum married Radosław Sikorski, who later served as Poland's Defence Minister, Foreign Minister, and Marshal of the Sejm. He is a member of the European Parliament. The couple have two sons, Aleksander and Tadeusz. She became a Polish citizen in 2013. She speaks Polish and Russian in addition to English.

Awards and honors
 1992 Charles Douglas-Home Memorial Trust Award
 2003 National Book Award Nonfiction, finalist, Gulag: A History
 2003 Duff Cooper Prize for Gulag: A History
 2004 Pulitzer Prize (General Non-Fiction), Gulag: A History
 2008 Estonian Order of the Cross of Terra Mariana third class
 2008 Lithuanian Millenium Star
 2010 Petőfi Prize
 2012 Officer's Cross of the Order of Merit of the Republic of Poland
 2012 National Book Award (Nonfiction), finalist, Iron Curtain: The Crushing of Eastern Europe 1944–1956
 2013 Cundill Prize, Iron Curtain: The Crushing of Eastern Europe 1944–1956
 2013 Duke of Westminster's Medal for Military Literature, Iron Curtain: The Crushing of Eastern Europe 1944–1956
 2017 Doctor of Humane Letters Honoris Causa, Georgetown University
 2017 Honorary Doctorate, National University of Kyiv-Mohyla Academy
 2017 Duff Cooper Prize for her book Red Famine: Stalin's War on Ukraine
 2017 Antonovych Prize
 2018 Lionel Gelber Prize for her book Red Famine: Stalin's War on Ukraine
 2018 Honorary Fritz Stern Professor, University of Wrocław
 2019  "Maestro del nostro tempo" ("Master of our Time")
 2019 Order of Princess Olga, third class
 2021 National Magazine Awards finalist in categories "Essays and Criticism" and "Columns and Commentary"
 2021 Premio Internacional de Periodismo de EL MUNDO
 2022 Order of Princess Olga, second class

Lectures and podcasts 
 2008 American Academy in Berlin lecture: Putinism, the Ideology
 2012–2013 Applebaum held the Phillip Roman chair at the London School of Economics and gave four major lectures on the history and contemporary politics of eastern Europe and Russia
 2015 Munk debates
 2016 Intelligence Squared
 2017 Sam Harris: The Russian Connection, The Path to Impeachment
 Jay Nordlinger: Putin and the Present Danger
 2017 Georgetown School of Foreign Service Commencement Speech
 2012 – 2020: Fresh Air

Bibliography

Books
 Between East and West: Across the Borderlands of Europe, Pantheon, 1994, reprinted by Random House, 1995; Penguin, 2015; and Anchor, 2017,  
 Gulag: A History, Doubleday, 2003, 677 pages, ; paperback, Bantam Dell, 2004, 736 pages, 
 Iron Curtain: The Crushing of Eastern Europe, 1944–1956, Allen Lane, 2012, 614 pages,  / Doubleday 
 Gulag Voices : An Anthology, Yale University Press, 2011, 224 pages, ; hardback
 From a Polish Country House Kitchen, Chronicle Books, 2012, 288 pages, ; hardback
 Red Famine: Stalin's War on Ukraine, Penguin Randomhouse, 2017
 Twilight of Democracy: The Seductive Lure of Authoritarianism, Doubleday, 2020, 224 pages, ; hardback
 Wybór (Choice), Agora, 2021, 320 pages, ISBN 978-8326838569; hardback

Selected articles
 
 
 
 
 
 "The Bad Guys Are Winning". The Atlantic. November 15, 2021.

References

General references 
  Reproduced in Biography Resource Center.

External links

 
 2005 Pulitzer Prize citation for Gulag: A History
 "Anne Applebaum, Opinion Writer" The Washington Post
 
  – 1:20 lecture by Anne Applebaum spoken in London School of Economics and Political Science (LSE), recorded on Monday, January 28, 2013.
 

1964 births
Living people
American columnists
American women columnists
American Reform Jews
American travel writers
American women travel writers
The Economist people
The Washington Post columnists
Pulitzer Prize for General Non-Fiction winners
Alumni of the London School of Economics
Alumni of St Antony's College, Oxford
American emigrants to Poland
American Enterprise Institute
Gulag in literature and arts
Historians of communism
Historians of Russia
Jewish American journalists
Jewish American writers
American people of Belarusian-Jewish descent
Journalists from Washington, D.C.
Marshall Scholars
Naturalized citizens of Poland
Recipients of the Order of the Cross of Terra Mariana, 3rd Class
Recipients of the Order of Princess Olga, 3rd class
Writers from Warsaw
Yale College alumni
Polish anti-communists
Polish Reform Jews
21st-century Polish historians
Polish columnists
Polish women columnists
Polish travel writers
Polish women journalists
20th-century Polish non-fiction writers
21st-century Polish non-fiction writers
21st-century American historians
20th-century American women writers
21st-century American women writers
20th-century Polish women writers
21st-century Polish women writers
20th-century American non-fiction writers
Jewish anti-communists
American women historians
Historians of the Soviet Union
20th-century Polish journalists
21st-century Polish journalists